Stanisław Antoni Iwan (1949–present) is a Polish business executive and former politician who is the Vice President of the Kostrzyn–Słubice Special Economic Zone. Voivode of the Lubusz Voivodeship (2000-2001). Member of the Senate of Poland from 2007-2015.

References
Strefa Biznesu - Gazeta Lubuska

Polish business executives
Polish chief executives
1949 births
Living people